Ternat (also ) is a municipality located in the Belgian province of Flemish Brabant. The municipality comprises the villages of Sint-Katherina-Lombeek, Ternat proper and Wambeek. It is also situated in the Pajottenland. On January 1, 2018 Ternat had a total population of 15.481. The total area is 24.48 km² which gives a population density of 597 inhabitants per km².

The village of Ternat is the site of a medieval sandstone church and the 12th-century Kruikenburg Castle, extensively remodelled in the 17th century. The local authority offices are housed in an 18th-century mansion.

Notable people
Everard t'Serclaes (c.1320–1388)

References

External links
 

Municipalities of Flemish Brabant